Paul I may refer to:

Paul of Samosata (200–275), Bishop of Antioch
Paul I of Constantinople (died c. 350), Archbishop of Constantinople
Pope Paul I (700–767)
Paul I Šubić of Bribir (c. 1245–1312), Ban of Croatia and Lord of Bosnia
Paul I, Serbian Patriarch, Archbishop of Peć and Serbian Patriarch (c. 1530–1541)
Paul I of Russia (1754–1801), Emperor of Russia
Paul Peter Massad (1806–1890), Maronite Patriarch of Antioch
Paul of Greece (1901–1964), King of Greece
 Pavle, Serbian Patriarch (1914–2009), Patriarch of the Serbian Orthodox Church

See also
Patriarch Paul I (disambiguation)